Amos Magezi is an Anglican bishop in Uganda: he has been the  Bishop of Northwest Ankole since 2017.

Magezi was born in 1963 in Kyeizooba, Bushenyi District. He waseducated Rwatsinga School, the Reformed Theological Seminary and Uganda Christian University. He was appointed the Diocesan Mission Coordinator of Ankole Diocese in 2001;  Chaplain of Mbarara High School and Dean of St. James Cathedral Ruharo in 2010. Magezi was consecrated  on 1 October 2017 at St. Paul's Cathedral, Ibanda.

References

Reformed Theological Seminary alumni
Uganda Christian University alumni
Anglican bishops of Northwest Ankole
21st-century Anglican bishops in Uganda
Living people
People from Bushenyi District
1963 births